{{Infobox television
| image                = Torchwood Declassified.jpg
| caption              =
| camera               = 
| picture_format       = 1080i (HDTV)576i (PAL)
| audio_format         = 
| runtime              = 10 minutes (series 1-2)30 minutes (series 3)15-30 minutes (series 4)
| creator              = 
| developer            = 
| producer             = 
| executive_producer   = 
| starring             = 
| narrated             = 
| theme_music_composer = 
| opentheme            = 
| endtheme             = 
| country              = United Kingdom
| language             = English
| network              = BBC Three (Series 1)BBC Two (Series 2)DVD Only (Series 3, Series 4)
| first_aired          = 
| last_aired           = 
| num_episodes         = 29
| list_episodes        = 
| preceded_by          = 
| followed_by          = 
| related              = TorchwoodDoctor Who Confidential 
}}Torchwood Declassified is a documentary series created by the BBC to complement the British science fiction television series Torchwood. Each episode is broadcast on the same evening as the broadcast of the weekly television episode. A second series of Declassified aired alongside the second series of Torchwood.

Continuing the tradition of its parent, Doctor Who Confidential, Torchwood Declassified covers themes presented in the just-broadcast episode, as well as providing behind-the-scenes access and footage. Each episode is ten minutes long, compared to Confidential's 30–45 minute length. Following transmission, the episodes were all available for viewing on the BBC's Torchwood website, but were later removed from the site after the end of the first series. Both series of the Declassified installments have been included on the series box sets.

Episodes

Series 1 (2006–2007)

Series 2 (2008)

Series 3 (2009)

One 30-minute episode was included on the DVD release of Children of Earth.

Series 4 (2011)
Two episodes were included on the DVD release of Torchwood: Miracle Day''. The first one was once again a half-hour episode, whereas the second one runs for fifteen minutes.

References

External links
 

 
 

Torchwood
2000s British documentary television series
2006 British television series debuts
Television series about television
BBC television documentaries
2011 British television series endings
English-language television shows